Linux Mint is a community-driven Linux distribution based on Ubuntu (which is in turn based on Debian), bundled with a variety of free and open-source applications. It can provide full out-of-the-box multimedia support for those who choose to include proprietary software such as multimedia codecs.

The Linux Mint project was created by Clément Lefèbvre and is actively maintained by the Linux Mint Team and community.

History
Linux Mint began in 2006 with a beta release, 1.0, code-named 'Ada', based on Kubuntu. Linux Mint 2.0 'Barbara' was the first version to use Ubuntu as its codebase. It had few users until the release of Linux Mint 3.0, 'Cassandra'. 

Linux Mint 2.0 was based on Ubuntu 6.10, using Ubuntu's package repositories and using it as a codebase. It then followed its own codebase, building each release from the previous one, but continuing to use the package repositories of the latest Ubuntu release. This made the two systems' bases almost identical, guaranteeing full compatibility between them, rather than requiring Mint to be a fork.

In 2008, Linux Mint adopted the same release cycle as Ubuntu and dropped its minor version number before releasing version 5 'Elyssa'. The same year, in an effort to increase compatibility between the two systems, Linux Mint decided to abandon its codebase and changed the way it built its releases. Starting with Linux Mint 6 'Felicia', each release was based completely on the latest Ubuntu release, built directly from it, and made available approximately one month after the corresponding Ubuntu release (usually in May or November).

In 2010, Linux Mint released Linux Mint Debian Edition (LMDE). Unlike the other Ubuntu-based editions (Ubuntu Mint), LMDE was originally a rolling release based directly on Debian and not tied to Ubuntu packages or its release schedule. It was announced on May 27, 2015, that the Linux Mint team would no longer support the original rolling release version of LMDE after January 1, 2016. LMDE 2 'Betsy' was a long term support release based on Debian Jessie. When LMDE 2 was released it was announced that all LMDE users would be automatically upgraded to new versions of MintTools software and new desktop environments before they were released into the main edition of Linux Mint. 

On February 20, 2016, the Linux Mint website was breached by unknown hackers who briefly replaced download links for a version of Linux Mint with a modified version containing malware. The hackers also breached the database of the website's user forum. Linux Mint immediately took its server offline and implemented enhanced security configuration for their website and forum.

Releases

Every version of Linux Mint is given a version number and code-named with a feminine first name ending in 'a' and beginning with a letter of the alphabet that increased with every major revision. Version 18 broke from the pattern with the name 'Sarah', though in English it retains the same final vowel sound as all of the other releases.

Initially, there were two Linux Mint releases per year. Following the release of Linux Mint 5 in 2008, every fourth release was labeled a long-term support (LTS) version, indicating that it was supported (with updates) for longer than traditional releases. Versions 5 and 9 had three years of support, and all LTS versions following received five years of support.

On May 31, 2014, with the release of Linux Mint 17, the Linux Mint team adopted a new release strategy. Starting with the release of Mint 17, all future versions were planned to use a LTS version of Ubuntu as a base, until 2016. Under this strategy, Mint 17.1 was released on November 29, 2014, Mint 17.2 was released on June 30, 2015, and Mint 17.3 was released on December 4, 2015. The 17.x releases are intended to be an easy, optional upgrade. All three versions included upgrades to the Cinnamon and MATE Desktop Environments and various Mint tools. In addition, Mint 17.2 and 17.3 included an upgrade to the LibreOffice suite. The 18.x series follows the pattern set by the 17.x series, by using Ubuntu 16.04 LTS as a base.

Linux Mint does not communicate specific release dates as new versions are published 'when ready', meaning that they can be released early when the distribution is ahead of schedule or late when critical bugs are found. New releases are announced, with much other material, on the Linux Mint blog.

On January 3, 2018, the Linux Mint Team released news of Linux Mint 19 'Tara'. The team stated that the 19.x releases would use GTK 3.22 and be based on Ubuntu 18.04 LTS, with support provided until 2023. On June 29, 2018, Linux Mint 19 'Tara' Cinnamon was released. Then, on December 24, 2019, Linux Mint 19.3, 'Tricia' was released, with security updates available until 2023.

On June 27, 2020, Linux Mint 20 'Ulyana' was released. It is an LTS version with support until 2025. On January 8, 2021, Linux Mint 20.1 'Ulyssa' was released. On July 8, 2021, Linux Mint 20.2 'Uma' was released. On January 5, 2022, Linux Mint 20.3 "Una" was released.

Up to 2014 there had been two Linux Mint releases per year, about one month after the Ubuntu releases they were based on. Each release was given a new version number and a code name, using a female first name starting with the letter whose alphabetical index corresponds to the version number and ending with the letter "a" (e.g., "Elyssa" for version 5, "Felicia" for version 6). There is also an OEM version for ease of installation for hardware manufacturers.

Releases were timed to be approximately one month after Ubuntu releases (which in turn are about one month after GNOME releases and two months after X Window System releases). Consequently, every Linux Mint release came with an updated version of both GNOME and X and features some of the improvements brought in the latest Ubuntu release. Support for most releases was discontinued two months after the next release, but since the mid-2008 v5 every fourth release has been labelled a long-term support version, indicating that it is supported (with updates) for longer, three years for v5 and v9, and five years thereafter.

Linux Mint 17 "Qiana" LTS was released on 31 May 2014, remaining current until the end of November 2014 and supported until April 2019. In mid-2014 the successor to 17 Qiana was announced to be 17.1 Rebecca; the development team said that from a technical point of view Linux Mint was no longer tied to the Ubuntu schedule, so it could be released at any time, although the six-month cycle provided rhythm, leading to a late November 2014 target. Linux Mint 17 LTS would be the first release of the 17.x series, and for two years applications would be backported to 17.x, with security updates until 2019.

The latest release is Linux Mint 21.1 "Vera", released on December 20, 2022. As an LTS release, it will be supported until 2027.

Linux Mint Debian Edition, not compatible with Ubuntu, is based on Debian and updates are brought in continuously between major versions (of LMDE).

Linux Mint Debian Edition release history

Features
Linux Mint primarily uses free and open-source software. Before version 18, some proprietary software, such as device drivers, Adobe Flash Player and codecs for MP3 and DVD-Video playback, were bundled with the OS. Version 18 does not install proprietary software. Starting with version 18.1, the installer provides an option to install third-party, proprietary software.

Linux Mint comes bundled with a wide range of application software, including LibreOffice, Firefox, Thunderbird, HexChat, Pidgin, Transmission, and VLC media player. Additional apps can be downloaded using the package manager, adding a PPA, or adding a source to the sources file in the /etc/apt/ directory. Linux Mint allows networking ports to be closed using its firewall, with customized port selection available. The default Linux Mint desktop environments, Cinnamon and MATE, support many languages. Linux Mint can also run many programs designed for Microsoft Windows (such as Microsoft Office), using the Wine compatibility layer.

Linux Mint is available with a number of desktop environments to choose from, including the default Cinnamon desktop, MATE and Xfce. Other desktop environments can be installed via APT, Synaptic, or via the custom Mint Software Manager.

Linux Mint implements Mandatory Access Control with AppArmor to enhance security by default, and restricts the default network-facing processes.

Linux Mint actively develops software for its operating system. Most of the development is done in Python and the source code is available on GitHub.

Software by Linux Mint

Cinnamon 
The Cinnamon desktop environment is a fork of GNOME Shell based on the innovations made in Mint Gnome Shell Extensions (MGSE). It was released as an add-on for Linux Mint 12 and has been available as a default desktop environment since Linux Mint 13.

MintTools
 Software Manager (mintInstall): Designed to install software from the Ubuntu and Linux Mint software repositories, as well as Launchpad PPAs. Since Linux Mint 18.3, the Software Manager has also been able to install software from Flatpak remotes, and is configured with Flathub by default. It features an interface heavily inspired by GNOME Software, and is built upon GTK3.
 Update Manager (mintUpdate): Designed to prevent inexperienced users from installing updates that are unnecessary or require a certain level of knowledge to configure properly. It assigns updates a safety level (from 1 to 5), based on the stability and necessity of the update. Updates can be set to notify users (as is normal), be listed but not notify, or be hidden by default. In addition to including updates specifically for the Linux Mint distribution, the development team tests all package-wide updates. In newer versions of the operating system, this safety level mechanism is largely deactivated in favour of system snapshots created by the Timeshift tool.
 Main Menu (mintMenu): Created for the MATE desktop environment. It is a menu of options including filtering, installation, and removal of software, system and places links, favourites, session management, editable items, custom places and many configuration options.
 Backup Tool (mintBackup): Enables the user to back up and restore data. Data can be backed up before a fresh install of a newer release, and then restored.
 Upload Manager (mintUpload): Defines upload services for FTP, SFTP and SCP servers. Services are then available in the system tray and provide zones where they may be automatically uploaded to their corresponding destinations. As of Linux Mint 18.3, this software is no longer installed by default but is still available in the Linux Mint software repositories.
 Domain Blocker (mintNanny): A basic domain blocking parental control tool introduced with v6. Enables the user to manually add domains to be blocked system-wide. As of Linux Mint 18.3, this software is no longer installed by default but is still available in the Linux Mint software repositories.
 Desktop Settings (mintDesktop): A tool for configuration of the desktop.
 Welcome Screen (mintWelcome): Introduced in Linux Mint 7, an application that starts on the first login of any new account. It provides links to the Linux Mint website, user guide, and community website.
 USB Image Writer/USB Stick Formatter (mintStick): A tool for writing an image onto a USB drive or formatting a USB stick. 
 System Reports (mintReport): Introduced in Linux Mint 18.3, the purpose of System Reports is to allow the user to view and manage automatically generated application crash reports.

Installation
Linux Mint can be booted and run from a USB flash drive on any PC capable of booting from a USB drive, with the option of saving settings to the flash drive. A USB creator program is available to install on Ubuntu (but not LMDE) Live Linux Mint on a USB drive. Alternatively, the Linux Mint ISO can be burned to a DVD to boot from.

The Windows installer Mint4Win allows Linux Mint to be installed from within Microsoft Windows, much like the Wubi installer for Ubuntu. The operating system could then be removed, as with other Windows software, using the Windows Control Panel. This method requires no partitioning of the hard drive. It is only useful for Windows users, and is not meant for permanent installations because it incurs a slight performance loss. This installer was included on the Live DVD until Linux Mint 16 but removed in the Linux Mint 16 'Petra' release because the size of the Live DVD images would have exceeded what the software could reliably handle.

Installation supports a Logical Volume Manager (LVM) with automatic partitioning only, and disk encryption since Linux Mint 15. UTF-8, the default character encoding, supports a variety of non-Roman scripts.

Editions
Linux Mint has multiple editions based on Ubuntu, with various desktop environments available. It also has a Debian-based edition.

Ubuntu-based editions
As of Linux Mint 13, there are two main editions developed by the core development team and using Ubuntu as a base. One includes Linux Mint's own Cinnamon as the desktop environment while the other uses MATE. There is also a version with the Xfce desktop environment by default. Since the release of version 19 (Tara) in June 2018, the three editions are released simultaneously.

Beginning with the release of Linux Mint 19, the KDE edition was officially discontinued; however, the KDE 17.x and 18.x releases were supported until 2019 and 2021, respectively. Older releases, now also obsolete, included editions that featured the GNOME, LXDE, and Fluxbox desktop environments by default.

Cinnamon (Edge) Edition
In addition to its regular ISO images, Linux Mint sometimes provides an “edge” ISO image for its latest release. This image ships with newer components to be able to support the most modern hardware chipsets and devices.

OEM version

The distribution provided an OEM version for manufacturers to use; however, this version was discontinued with the release of v18 Sarah in order to reduce the number of ISO images that needed to be maintained. Manufacturers wanting to perform an OEM install now have the option to choose so in the live CD boot menu.

No Codecs version
The distribution provided a 'No Codecs' version for magazines, companies, and distributors in the United States, Japan, and countries where the legislation allows patents to apply to software and distribution of restricted technologies may require the acquisition of third-party licences; however, this version was discontinued with release of v18 Sarah. Users now have the option of whether or not to install multimedia codecs during the installation; additionally, multimedia codecs can also be installed via a link on the Mint Welcome Screen any time after installation.

LMDE

The Linux Mint Debian Edition (LMDE) uses Debian Stable as the software source base rather than Ubuntu. LMDE was originally based directly on Debian's Testing branch, but is designed to provide the same functionality and look and feel as the Ubuntu-based editions. LMDE has its own package repositories.

LMDE claims certain advantages and disadvantages compared to 'Mint Main' (i.e., the Ubuntu-based editions):

 LMDE is faster and more responsive than Ubuntu-based editions.
 LMDE requires a deeper knowledge and experience with Linux and Debian package management.
 Debian is less user-friendly and desktop-ready than Ubuntu, with some rough edges.

LMDE 1
The original LMDE (now often referred to as LMDE 1) had a semi-rolling release development model, which periodically introduced 'Update Packs' (tested snapshots of Debian Testing). Installing an Update Pack allowed the user to keep LMDE 1 current, without having to reinstall the system every six months as with Mint Main. As of May 17, 2015, it has an upgrade path to LMDE 2.

LMDE 2

LMDE 2 (a.k.a. Betsy) was released on April 10, 2015. LMDE 2 is based on Debian Stable, but receives automatic updates to the latest versions of MintTools and the installed desktop environment before they are released into the Mint Main edition. LMDE 2 is available with both the MATE and Cinnamon desktop environments. Both image versions received an update in January 2017. As of the start of 2019, this version is no longer supported. 

LMDE 2 remains based on sysvinit but with a 'functional logind' from systemd.

LMDE 3

LMDE 3 (a.k.a. Cindy) is 'very likely' to complete the switch to systemd from sysvinit. It is based on Debian Stretch, and was released on August 31, 2018, shipping as a single edition with Cinnamon. As of July 1, 2020, this version is no longer supported.

LMDE 4 
LMDE 4 (a.k.a. Debbie) is based on Debian Buster (version 10), and was released on March 20, 2020. This version ships as a single edition using Cinnamon.

LMDE 5 
LMDE 5 (a.k.a. Elsie) is based on Debian Bullseye (version 11), and was released on March 20, 2022. It ships with the Cinnamon desktop environment and supports both amd64 and i386 architectures.

Development
Individual users and companies using the operating system act as donors, sponsors and partners of the distribution. Linux Mint relies on user feedback to make decisions and orient its development. The official blog often features discussions where users are asked to voice their opinion about the latest features or decisions implemented for upcoming releases. Ideas can be submitted, commented upon and rated by users via the Linux Mint Community Website.

The community of Linux Mint users use Launchpad to participate in the translation of the operating system and in reporting bugs.

Most development is done in Python and organized online using GitHub, making it easy for developers to provide patches, implement additional features, and also fork Linux Mint sub-projects (for example the Linux Mint menu was ported to Fedora). With each release, features are added that are developed by the community. In Linux Mint 9, for instance, the ability to edit menu items is a feature that was contributed by a Linux Mint user.

Reception
In May 2013, David Hayward of TechRadar praised Linux Mint for focusing on desktop users.

In a 2012 online poll at Lifehacker, Linux Mint was voted the second best Linux distribution, after Ubuntu, with almost 16% of the votes. In October 2012 (Issue 162), Linux Format named Linux Mint the best distro for 2012. In July 2013 (Issue 128), Linux User & Developer gave Linux Mint 15 'Olivia' a score of 5/5, stating 'We haven't found a single problem with the distro... we're more than satisfied with the smooth, user-friendly experience that Linux Mint 15, and Cinnamon 1.8, provides for it to be our main distro for at least another 6 months'.

Reviews of Linux Mint 18 'Sarah' were somewhat mixed, with several that were quite favorable and others critical of several specific new problems, with multiple reviews complaining about the lack of multimedia/codec support by default. Multimedia codecs that had previously been included in the standard Mint distribution were no longer included in 'Sarah', but could be loaded with a graphical application that one Ars Technica reviewer said should be obvious for new users.

ZDNet Contributing Editor Steven J. Vaughan-Nichols, reviewing Linux Mint 19 and LM 19.1 in the articles 'The Linux Mint desktop continues to lead the rest' in July 2018 and 'The better-than-ever Linux desktop' in December 2018, noted Mint's quality, stability, security and user-friendliness compared to other popular distributions. ZDNet's review of Linux Mint 19.2 said: 'After looking at many Linux desktops year in and out, Linux Mint is the best of the breed. It's easy to learn (even if you've never used Linux before), powerful, and with its traditional windows, icons, menus, and pointers (WIMP) interface, it's simple to use.'

Minimum hardware requirements
For Linux Mint 21.1, either Cinnamon, MATE, or XFCE edition:
2GB of RAM (4GB recommended)
20GB of storage space (100GB recommended)
1024×768 screen resolution
Either a CD/DVD drive or a USB flash drive for the installation media
Internet access is helpful

Versions prior to Linux Mint 20 allowed booting from either i386 (32 bit) or amd64 (64 bit) architectures.

Starting with Linux Mint 20 only the amd64 (64 bit) architecture will be supported. This is because Canonical decided to drop 32-bit support from Ubuntu 20.04, which is the base from which Linux Mint 20 is derived. LMDE still supports the x86 architecture.

See also
 List of Ubuntu-based Linux distributions

References

Further reading

External links

 
 
 Differences in Linux Mint desktop choices - Cinnamon, MATE, Xfce, or KDE

2006 software
Computer-related introductions in 2006
Free software operating systems
Linux distributions
Ubuntu derivatives
X86-64 Linux distributions